Ralph E. Starenko is a former American football coach.  He served as the head football coach at Concordia University Nebraska from 1959 to 1963, Augustana College in Rock Island, Illinois from 1964 to 1968, and Augustana College—now known as Augustana University in Sioux Falls, South Dakota from 1969 to 1976, compiling a career college football coaching record of 84–77–6.  He played college football at Valparaiso University, from which he graduated in 1954.

Head coaching record

References

Year of birth missing (living people)
Living people
Augustana (Illinois) Vikings football coaches
Augustana (South Dakota) Vikings football coaches
Concordia Bulldogs football coaches
Valparaiso Beacons football players
Valparaiso Beacons football coaches 
Quantico Marines Devil Dogs football players